Economic diplomacy is a form of diplomacy that uses the full spectrum of economic tools of a state to achieve its national interests.  The scope of economic diplomacy can encompass all of the international economic activities of a state, including, but not limited to, policy decisions designed to influence exports, imports, investments, lending, aid, free trade agreements, etc.

Economic diplomacy is concerned with economic policy issues, e.g. work of delegations at standard setting organizations such as World Trade Organization (WTO). Economic diplomats also monitor and report on economic policies in foreign countries and give the home government advice on how to best influence them. Economic diplomacy employs economic resources, either as rewards or sanctions, in pursuit of a particular foreign policy objective. This is sometimes called "economic statecraft".

Background and definitions
Economic diplomacy is traditionally defined as the decision-making, policy-making and advocating for the sending state's business interests. Economic diplomacy requires application of technical expertise that analyze the effects of a country's (receiving state) economic situation on its political climate and on the sending state's economic interests. The sending state and receiving state, foreign business leaders, as well as government decision-makers, work together on some of the most cutting-edge issues in foreign policy, such as technology, the environment, and HIV/AIDS, as well as in the more traditional areas of trade and finance. Versatility, flexibility, sound judgment and strong business skills are all needed in the execution of economic diplomacy.

 	Scope: international and domestic economic issues – this includes the “rules for economic relations between states” that has been pursued since World War II. And owing to the increased globalization and the resultant interdependence among state during the 1990s obliges “economic diplomacy to go deep into domestic decision making” as well. This covers “policies relating to production, movement or exchange of goods, services, instruments (including official development assistance), money information and their regulation” (Bayne and Woolcock (eds) 2007)
 	Players: state and non-state actors – All government agencies that are involved in international economic mandates are players in economic diplomacy (though they often do not describe them as such). Further, non-state actors such as non-government organisations (NGOs) engaged in international economic activities are also players in economic diplomacy (Bayne and Woolcock (eds) 2007). Businesses and investors are also actors in the processes of economic diplomacy, especially when contacts between them and governments are initiated or facilitated by diplomats.

Berridge and James (2003) state that “economic diplomacy is concerned with economic policy questions, including the work of delegations to conferences sponsored by bodies such as the WTO” and include “diplomacy which employs economic resources, either as rewards or  sanctions, in pursuit of a particular foreign policy objective” also as a part of the definition.

Rana (2007) defines economic diplomacy as “the process through which countries tackle the outside world, to maximize their national gain in all the fields of activity including trade, investment and other forms of economically beneficial exchanges, where they enjoy comparative advantage.; it has bilateral, regional and multilateral dimensions, each of which is important”.

The broad scope of this latter definition is especially applicable to the practice of economic diplomacy as it is unfolding in emerging economies. This new approach involves an analysis of a nation's economy, taking into account not only its officially reported figures but also its gray, or unreported,  economic factors. An example might be the new Republic of Kosovo; in that emerging nation, widely regarded as a candidate for "poorest nation in Europe", an enormous amount of economic activity appears to be unreported or undocumented by a weak and generally ineffectual central government. When all economic factors are considered, the so-called "poorest" nations are demonstrably healthier and thus more attractive to investment than the raw statistics might otherwise show.

Emerging economies have learned that they are not flowers and businesses are not like bees; in other words, a nation that wants to attract business must be proactive rather than passive. They must seek out opportunities and learn to bring them home. Tax and other concessions will likely be necessary and in the short term costly. However, creative support of new business opportunities can generate major chances for success. This sort of activity is also a part of economic diplomacy.

The sort of economic diplomacy that utilizes a nation's already-deployed corps of diplomats to promote the nation and seek business opportunities is not traditional, but its effectiveness is apparent. Emerging nations seeking to conserve scarce personnel and financial resources immediately benefit from multitasking.

Three elements 
1. Commercial diplomacy and NGO's: The use of political influence and relationships to promote and/or influence international trade and investment, to improve on functioning of markets and/or to address market failures and to reduce costs and risks of cross border transactions(including property rights).

2. Structural policies and bilateral trade and investment agreements: The use of economic assets and relationships to increase the cost of conflict and to strengthen the mutual benefits of cooperation and politically stable relationships, i.e. to increase economic security.

3. International organizations: Ways to consolidate the right political climate and international political economic environment to facilitate and institute these objectives.

Strategies

Brazil
Brazil has made a concerted effort to engage in economic diplomacy with the developing world.  Brazil has made it a priority to be a leader in sharing technological knowledge in areas such as education and the all important agricultural sector.

One example of Brazil's economic diplomacy strategy is the Brazilian Cooperation Agency (ABC), which is affiliated with the Brazilian Ministry of External Relations.  The ABC has the mandate to negotiate, coordinate, implement and monitor technical cooperation projects and programs with countries, primarily in the developing world, that Brazil has agreements with.  As Brazil States:

"Brazil has been investing in agreements with both developed and developing countries to acquire and disseminate knowledge applied to social and economic development. We have practiced the concept of not simply receiving knowledge from developed countries, but also sharing our own experiences with others in effective partnerships towards development.

South-South cooperation contributes to consolidating Brazil’s relations with partner countries as it enhances general interchange; generates, disseminates and applies technical knowledge; builds human resource capacity; and, mainly, strengthens institutions in all nations involved.

Taking these goals into account, ABC has defined focal partners that include African Portuguese-speaking countries (PALOPs), East Timor, Latin America and the Caribbean. In this context, we have started cooperating trilaterally with developed countries as well.

The ultimate goal of technical cooperation – exchanging experiences and knowledge – materializes reciprocal solidarity among peoples and does not only benefit recipient countries, but Brazil as well."

The ABC is a primary example of how Brazil is using economic diplomacy to fit into its larger national strategy of providing leadership in the developing world.

China

Economic diplomacy is a central aspect of Chinese foreign policy.  During China's remarkable economic rise, it has used economic diplomacy primarily through trade, and the use of carrots as a means to accumulate or attract soft power.  This was a part of the broader strategy formulated by think tanks in the PRC during the 1990s titled the new security concept.  It is referred to in the West as the period of "China's Peaceful Rise".

Recently, China has changed its strategic doctrine and begun to use economic diplomacy as a coercive tool.  After 10 years or so of a policy based primarily on economic carrots, China has begun to show a willingness to use economic diplomacy for coercive means.  This is evidenced in the September 2010 incident that blocked shipments of rare earth minerals to Japan.  Another incident took place in 2012 in the Philippines, where China sent a gunboat in to enforce trade restricts.  China's willingness to use bring in warships during trade disputes is reminiscent to an earlier era of American gunboat diplomacy. Recent history shows that as China grows more confident, it will be seen gradually to move away from an economic diplomacy policy of carrots, to sticks.

Kazakhstan
Kazakhstan has formally identified economic diplomacy as a key function of the country's foreign policy to yield productive economic and trade relations at bilateral and multilateral levels. The Ministry of Trade and Integration of Kazakhstan, or MTI, was created to oversee the country's economic diplomacy. The MTI and the Ministry of Foreign Affairs are key entities responsible for executing economic diplomacy and promoting Kazakhstan's economic goals abroad.

Kazakhstan hosted a South-South Development Exchange on Economic Diversification and Industrialization in Africa with 43 African governments.

United States

The United States has a long history of economic diplomacy dating back to the dollar diplomacy of William Howard Taft.  The United States was also central to perhaps the most important economic diplomacy event, the Bretton Woods Conference where the International Monetary Fund and International Bank of Reconstruction and Development were created.  The United States was involved in one of the more notable acts of economic diplomacy in history with the Marshall Plan.

Though it has always played an important role, Economic diplomacy took on increased importance during the first term of President Barack Obama under the leadership of Secretary of State Hillary Clinton. During a major policy speech as Secretary of State, Clinton stated that economic statecraft is at the heart of (the American) foreign policy agenda. Clinton saw economic development and democratic development as inextricably linked. In her speech she explained the importance of its success:

Secretary Clinton saw pursuing mutually beneficial trade between the United States and other areas of the world as central to the American diplomatic agenda. She went on to detail the American strategy for several significant regions.

Obama administration strategies
On Russia: "Even in a U.S.-Russia relationship dominated for decades by politics and security, we are now focused on helping Russia join the World Trade Organization, and we are putting a special premium on protecting freedom of navigation and a rules-based approach to resource development in places like the South China Sea and the Arctic Ocean."

On Europe: "Together, America and Europe account for half of the world’s economic output, but just one-third of global trade. We can and we should be trading more. At the Transatlantic Economic Council, too often we re-litigate regulatory differences when we ought to be resolving them and avoiding new ones. And this frustrates companies on both sides of the Atlantic. The Transatlantic Economic Council is the forum where we try to resolve these differences, and I believe harmonizing regulatory schemes between the United States and the EU is one of the best ways we can both enhance growth, enhance exports, and avoid duplicative costs. But if you spend weeks arguing about the size of a jar for baby food, that’s not exactly facing up to the potential of the payoff that comes from resolving these issues."

On China: "We also need to promote the free flow of capital, too. Investment in both directions, backed by well-enforced rules, is vital to creating growth and jobs here at home. For example, last year, the Kentucky-based company that owns KFC and Pizza Hut, two iconic American brands, actually made more money selling pizza and fried chicken in China than in the United States. But this creates jobs at headquarters in Louisville and it creates jobs as well in China. When Tom Friedman warns that the Chinese will “eat our lunch,” I'm not sure that's what he had in mind."

On the Middle East: "Consider the transitions underway in Egypt, Tunisia, and Libya. If we want to see democracy take root, which we do, we have to bring advanced tools to bear to help countries reform economic systems designed to keep autocrats and elites in power. And we know that aid alone, no matter how generous, is not enough. We need a sophisticated effort to integrate the region’s economies, to promote investment, and to assist in economic modernization. This is the logic behind the Middle East proposals that the President laid out in May, which I have been urging Congress to support. To succeed, the Arab political awakening must also be an economic awakening."

On Latin America: "we are also making it a priority to engage with the Latin American jaguars, if you can call them that, which grew by more than six percent last year. Our free trade agreements with Panama and Colombia move us closer to our ultimate goal of a hemispheric trade partnership reaching from the Arctic to the tip of Argentina."

On the Pacific Basin: "...we will continue to use the Asia Pacific Economic Cooperation Forum, which President Obama will host next month in Hawaii, to push the envelope on open, free, transparent, and fair trade across the Pacific basin."

Trump administration strategies 
The Trump administration believed that previous bilateral relationships between the US and China did not benefit the US enough, so it decided to pursue a mostly unilateral attitude towards interacting with China. This new perspective became official on Oct. 4, 2018, when Vice President Pence spoke out about how China would be pressured by the United States to change its stance on a variety of issues, including discriminatory trade barriers, forced technology transfer between US and Chinese companies, and militarization of outposts in the South China Sea. According to Brookings, the Trump administration seems to have an inconsistent high-level strategy, which resulted in US government agencies creating their own strategies for interacting with China.

In particular, the Trump administration has targeted asserted unfair treatment in trade and investment policies. For instance, China requires foreign firms to make investments through creating joint ventures with Chinese companies—especially within the telecom, finance and auto industries—and subsequent transfer of technology to the domestic companies. This can undermine the intellectual property rights of these foreign firms. Furthermore, an estimated one-third of the Chinese economy consists of state-owned enterprises that can be given preferential treatment by Chinese banks and government. Some of these institutions seem to be pursuing strategic investments globally, including in free-market nations such as the US. Thus, America and other nations are urging China to eliminate favoritism for their local companies within its domestic market.

Since 2016, the US has executed multiple actions towards China in response to the above issues. First, the government has implemented tariffs on a variety of imports, such as photographic films. Also, it has heavily scrutinized Chinese-based companies that have committed economic offenses against US interests. For example, the US Department of Commerce almost fined the Chinese telecom company ZTE for violating US-Iranian sanctions. However, Trump blocked this decision because he thought too many Chinese jobs would be lost, excessively impacting US-China relations.  While this displays the administration's ability to tackle any economic issues arising with China, it also exemplifies how inconsistent such reactions might be. The US also withdrew from some agreements intended to contain Chinese economic expansion, such as the Trans-Pacific Partnership.

While some believe that the Trump administration's tariffs on China may help defend American economic interests, others argue that it would escalate trade barriers between these nations and cause negative effects within the US. According to Forbes, US tariffs might be raised to impact over $200 billion worth of imports, including consumer goods and smart products (LEDs, thermometers etc).

India
India has engaged in economic diplomacy primarily through the use of trade and aid.  For example, in order to build a stronger, more stable relationship with Bangladesh, India granted it an $800 million soft loan, and provided $200 million in aid.

India set up a development wing in its government in January 2012. The Development Partners Administration (DPA), is a primary way India uses economic diplomacy, in this case development aid, as a way to engage diplomatically. The DPA is building 50,000 housing units in Sri Lanka, a large transmission line in Puli Khumri, Afghanistan, and extends Lines of Credit projects globally, particularly in Africa.

Economic diplomacy and the DPA are very important to Indian foreign policy. As the former Indian Foreign Secretary Lalit Mansingh stated: "The fact that the DPA division is located in the ministry of external affairs shows it is in sync with our foreign policy objectives of transforming India into a global player”.

Case studies

2010 Nobel Peace Prize

In response to the 2010 Nobel Peace Prize going to Chinese dissident Liu Xiaobo from the Norwegian Nobel Committee, China froze free trade agreement negotiations with Norway and imposed new veterinary inspections on imports of Norwegian salmon. This caused the volume of salmon imports from Norway to shrink by 60% in 2011.

2012 Incident with the Philippines in the South China Sea

Recently, China has become more assertive in its claim that the South China Sea is part of its territory.  This has caused several disputes with the
seven sovereign states who also claim part of the South China Sea as their own territory.  In one such dispute, China and the Philippines engaged in a standoff over the Scarborough Shoal in which Navy vessels were sent in.  In retaliation to this territorial conflict, China engaged in coercive economic diplomacy by blocking Philippine bananas from entering Chinese ports, as well as slowing down the inspections of papayas, mangoes, coconuts, and pineapples from the Philippines.  Philippine businessmen pressured their government to stand down.  According to Manila, Chinese Vessels now block the entrance to the lagoon, preventing any Philippine ships from entering, in another example of China using coercive economic diplomacy.

2019 Impact of loans to Venezuela 
In China's $1 trillion “Belt and Road” Project, the country provides loans and invests in furthering projects (infrastructure etc.) within other developing countries. One example is in Venezuela, where China instigated soft loans up to $20 billion annually. In return, Venezuela promised to export large amounts of oil to China. However, when oil prices collapsed in 2014, Venezuela accumulated $20 billion in debt towards China (out of $150 billion total external debt). In response, China continued to hand out loans with little accountability, with the money mostly being used for political purposes or other reasons. With the current ongoing Venezuelan political crisis, it is unknown if whoever assumes power will be able to repay the nation's high debt to China. According to some critics of the Belt project, this example sheds light on how Chinese economic diplomacy policies may cause some developing nations to accumulate high debt repayments towards China.

See also
Commercial diplomacy
Defence diplomacy
 Economic warfare
 Energy diplomacy
 Medical diplomacy
 Public diplomacy
 Soft power

References

Diplomacy
Types of diplomacy